Dongguan Prison is located in the Shilong area of Dongguan, Guangdong, China.

History
According to the Laogai Research Foundation, the Dongguan Prison opened in November 1988 as Shilong Prison, and was given its present name in 1995.

The prison complex was expanded in the subsequent decades, so that it now occupies most of Xinzhou, an island in the East River upon which the prison is situated.

Inmate population
According to a July 2013 report by the Shenzhen-based Daily Sunshine, Dongguan Prison has a population of around 5,000 inmates. The report stated that nearly 500 of the prisoners were foreigners from various countries. The prison reportedly received its first foreign inmate in 1996.

Living conditions and forced labour
Prisoners at Dongguan Prison are reportedly forced to work manufacturing goods, and are allegedly routinely beaten. In 2013, former inmates told The Australian Financial Review that they were forced to make disposable headphones sold to major airlines for the equivalent of around £0.85 per month. They said they were beaten, tasered, or put in solitary confinement for failing to achieve production targets.

Similarly, Der Spiegel interviewed several ex-inmates of Dongguan Prison in 2019. They described overcrowded living conditions and sweltering heat in the summertime. A German ex-prisoner said that the prisoners were forced to work nine-hour days, six or seven days a week, manufacturing model Porsche cars, Samsonite-branded luggage locks, and transformers. Several ex-inmates described torture and abuse of prisoners, including the strapping of prisoners to a torture chair for days or weeks, and electric shocks.

Notable prisoners
 Chen Meng – musician jailed for leaking a Chinese government blacklist of overseas dissidents
 Lau Chun-hin – Hong Kong Internet personality
 James Peng Jiandong – Australian businessman abducted in 1993 from Macau, then a Portuguese territory, by the Chinese government. Transferred to Qingpu Prison in 1997.

See also
 List of prisons in Guangdong

References

External links
  (not secure)

1988 establishments in China
Buildings and structures in Dongguan
Prisons in Guangdong
Buildings and structures completed in 1988